Amit K. Bhardwaj (17 January 1983 – 15 January 2022) was an Indian who was involved in big scam who founded Amaze Mining and Blockchain Research Limited which ran GB [Gainbitcoin] Miners among other bitcoin-related businesses and projects, these have been described as various types of Ponzi schemes.

In April 2018, Gainbitcoin was found to be one of the biggest bitcoin scams. The cyber cell of Pune Police arrested Bhardwaj and his brothers along with co-founders of GB Miners - Nikunj Jain and Sahil Baghla for running a  million cryptocurrency Ponzi scheme. Bhardwaj was indicted for running a pyramid scheme in relation to the MCAP token taken out by Gainbitcoin and was produced before a special court on 5 April 2018.

So far, more than eight people have been arrested and all of them were associated with Gainbitcoin and CEO Bhardwaj.

Early life and education
Bhardwaj was born in India on 17 January 1983. He attended Kendriya Vidyalaya (1998–2000). He later graduated from  Mahatma Gandhi Mission's College of Engineering and Technology, Nanded, Maharashtra (2000–2004) with a B. Tech in computer science and engineering.

Career
In 2016, Amit founded Amaze Mining and Blockchain Research Limited, an altcoin mining technology firm. He  founded  GB Miners, an Indian bitcoin mining pool in 2016, which was later revealed to be a Ponzi scam.

Gainbitcoin and GBMiners
In a series of interviews Bhardwaj gave to The Caravan in 2017, he first claimed to not have any part in Gainbitcoin and that he knew of it only as a cloud-mining company, but later argued that he hid his involvement as a "PR strategy". He also misrepresented total investment in Gainbitcoin and admitted to inflating the figure on the company's website. Bhardwaj also denied any links between Gainbitcoin and GBMiners, though many of the former's investors believed the latter to be the minepool.

Personal life and death
Bhardwaj suffered from several kidney ailments toward the end of his life. He died after suffering a cardiac arrest on 15 January 2022, at the age of 38.

See also 
 Bitconnect, India-based bitcoin Ponzi scheme
 Cryptocurrency and crime

Further reading 
 GainBitcoin Cryptocurrency Scam. Indian Institute of Corporate Affairs.

References

External links
Official Website

1983 births
2022 deaths
Confidence tricksters
Indian chief executives
Indian fraudsters
Pyramid and Ponzi schemes
Deaths from kidney disease
Cybercrime in India
Kendriya Vidyalaya alumni
Criminals from Maharashtra